Flaming sword may refer to:

 Flaming sword (mythology), in myth and legend, a sword glowing with flame by some supernatural power
 Flaming sword (effect), a sword coated with combustible fuel and set ablaze for various types of performances
 Vriesea splendens or flaming sword, a species of flowering plant
 The Flaming Sword, a publication of the Satanist neo-Nazi group Black Order

Arts and entertainment
 "Flaming Sword", a 1983 song by Care
 The Flaming Sword (1915 film), an American lost silent film
 The Flaming Sword (1958 film), a British film
 The Flaming Sword (novel), a 1939 novel by Thomas Dixon Jr.
 The Flaming Sword, a 1914 novel by George Fort Gibbs; basis for the 1915 film

See also
 Fire and sword (disambiguation)
 Flame-bladed sword, a type of historical sword
 Sword of Flame (disambiguation)